Finist is the falcon in the Slavic mythology.
 The Feather of Finist the Falcon, Russian fairy tale
 Finist - Yasnyy sokol, a Soviet 1975 film

Also Finist may be referred to:
 Technoavia SM92 Finist
 Finist'air, an airline in France
 Finistère, a département of France